The 1925–26 Huddersfield Town season saw Town become the first team in English football to achieve the hat-trick of 1st Division championships, a feat which as of the end of the 2019–20 season has not been surpassed.

Under the leadership of Cecil Potter, Town finished 5 points clear of Arsenal, now managed by Herbert Chapman.

Squad at the start of the season

Review
Following the sudden resignation of Herbert Chapman, who joined Arsenal as their new manager, Town brought in Cecil Potter to steer the ship. Town continued their brilliant run of form with Charlie Wilson and George Brown being joined in the strikeforce department by Chapman's last signing Alex Jackson. Unfortunately injury cost Wilson his season and he moved to Stoke City by the end of the season. However, George Cook joined Jackson and Brown up front and between them scored 65 of Town's 92 league goals during the season.

They won their 3rd title with 2 games remaining after beating Bolton Wanderers 3-0 at Leeds Road with goals from Jackson, Billy Smith and Clem Stephenson. They finished 5 points clear of Chapman's Arsenal. That success was commemorated with a special trophy that has only been copied on 3 occasions for Arsenal, Liverpool and Manchester United.

Squad at the end of the season

Results

Division One

FA Cup

Appearances and goals

1925-26
English football clubs 1925–26 season
1926